The Sknyliv air show disaster occurred on Saturday, 27 July 2002, when a Ukrainian Air Force Sukhoi Su-27 piloted by Volodymyr Toponar (of the Ukrainian Falcons) and co-piloted by Yuriy Yegorov crashed during an aerobatics presentation at Sknyliv airfield near Lviv, Ukraine. The accident killed 77 people and injured 543, 100 of whom were hospitalized. It is the deadliest air show accident in history.

Accident 
More than 10,000 spectators attended the air show, staged to commemorate the 60th anniversary of the Ukrainian Air Force's 14th Air Corps. The Su-27 aircraft was flown by two experienced pilots; it entered a rolling maneuver at 12:52 p.m. with a downward trajectory at low altitude. It rolled upright once more and was still descending rapidly when the left wing dropped shortly before it hit the ground, at which point the crew initiated ejection. The aircraft flattened out initially, skidding over the ground towards stationary aircraft and striking a glancing blow against the nose of an Ilyushin Il-76 transport aircraft, before beginning to explode and cartwheel into the crowd of spectators.

Both pilots survived with minor injuries, while 77 spectators were killed, including 28 children. Another 100 were hospitalized for head injuries, burns, and bone fractures. Other injuries were less severe and did not require hospitalization. A total of 543 people were injured in the accident.

Following the disaster, the pilots stated that the flight map which they had received differed from the actual layout. On the cockpit voice recorder, one pilot asks, "And where are our spectators?". Others have suggested that the pilots were slow to react to automated warnings issued by the flight computer.
Some bystanders suffered serious mental disorders from what they saw.

Aftermath 
Ukrainian President Leonid Kuchma publicly blamed the military for the disaster and dismissed the head of the air force, General Viktor Strelnykov. Minister of Defense Volodymyr Shkidchenko offered his resignation, but Kuchma rejected it.

On 24 June 2005, a military court sentenced pilot Volodymyr Toponar and co-pilot Yuriy Yegorov to fourteen and eight years in prison, respectively. The court found the two pilots and three other military officials guilty of failing to follow orders, negligence, and violating flight rules. Two of the three officials were sentenced to up to six years in prison; the third received up to four years. Toponar was ordered to pay ₴7.2 million (US$1.42 million; €1.18 million) in compensation to the families, and Yegorov ₴2.5 million. The crew's main flight trainer was acquitted for lack of evidence. 

After the verdict was announced, Toponar said that he planned to appeal, insisting that the crash was due to technical problems and a faulty flight plan. Yegorov was released in 2008 after President Viktor Yushchenko issued a decree reducing his sentence to three and a half years.

The pilots were assigned the majority of the blame, which included accusations of attempting maneuvers with which they were not experienced. Toponar had requested an additional training flight at the airfield where the display was to be performed, but the request was denied.

Near the end of his prison term, Toponar reasserted his innocence in a phone interview. "From the mission briefing it is obvious that the flight area parameters we were given significantly exceeded the safe margin of separation from spectators. What happened is the fault of organizers. Planes must not fly over spectators. During the show, I had to make several advanced maneuvers in a few minutes. During the half-barrel, I noticed decreased thrust of both engines and the airspeed fell. But the cause remains unknown! Ground control ordered us to continue the flight. During the last maneuver—an oblique loop with a turn—the plane became uncontrollable. During the trial they said it was caused by pilot error due to inexperience. I have 27 years in the cockpit with 2000 hours flying time. I was a member of the Ukrainian Falcons…  To the last I struggled to lift the plane, [but] copilot Yuriy Yegorov hit the catapult [triggering ejection] and we two ejected with our seats."

See also 
 Lists of air show accidents and incidents

References

External links 
  Prosecution's Aerobatics After the Sknyliv Tragedy (2006 journalist investigation of the accident, includes photos of the crash moment)
  2004 Article in Ukrainian Dzerkalo Tyznhya weekly
 Sydney Morning Herald article
 CNN article 

Aviation accidents and incidents at air shows
Accidents and incidents involving military aircraft
Ukrainian Air Force
History of Lviv
Aviation accidents and incidents in 2002
Aviation accidents and incidents in Ukraine
2002 in Ukraine
July 2002 events in Ukraine
2002 disasters in Ukraine